Netherby is an unincorporated rural community in the city of Niagara Falls, Niagara Region, Ontario, Canada.

History
Netherby had a post office from 1862 to 1914.

By 1874, Netherby had a saw mill, store, and a population of 100.

In 1887, an independent agricultural society called the Netherby Union Agricultural Society had established its headquarters in Netherby.

Little remains of the original settlement but a store, the Netherby Variety and Convenience Store.

References

Neighbourhoods in Niagara Falls, Ontario